Legends of War is a turn-based strategy video game series franchise created in 2010 by the Spanish development company Enigma Software Productions.

The series is for PSP, PS3, Xbox 360, PC and PS Vita, and is set in different time periods and wars across history experienced through charismatic military legends.

The first title of the series is Legends of War: Patton's Campaign, set during World War II, in the General Patton campaign to end Nazi rule. It was first launched on October 20, 2010 on PSN for PSP system only. Later (April 2013) for the other platforms.

Awards 
Legends of War: Patton's Campaign won an award at the VI Editions of Desarrollador_Es for the "Best Handheld Game" in 2011.

Gameplay 
The player assumes the role of George S. Patton of the US army, during the late stages of the conflict, from the Normandy invasion, to the German capitulation and the end of the war in Europe. The player has the opportunity to change history and reach Berlin before the Soviet army does.

The game starts one month after the Normandy landings, when the command of the U.S. Third Army is assigned to Patton. Through different operations, the player advances along the historical path of Patton's Third Army traversing the Western European Theatre of operations.

Patton's campaign in Europe is divided into seven different operations, which are in turn divided into 35 different missions on 22 different maps.

Modes 
• The Patton's Campaign: The player controls Patton's Third Army from the French beaches to the German capital. Through different operations, the player advances along the historical path of Patton's Third Army traversing the Western European Theatre of operations.

• Multiplayer Mode (Hotseat): This mechanism uses a system of turns which allows two players to play the game using the same console, one controlling the American forces and the other controlling the German forces.

Patton’s improvements 
Patton is the main character in the game, and he is also the one who represents the player's role in the campaign. Patton's characteristics will directly affect his troops' performance in the missions. Initially Patton has certain points for each characteristic, so the player will be able to increase those points after each mission. Players can upgrade in 7 categories, namely Prestige, Offensive capabilities, Defensive capabilities, Tactical capabilities, Logistics, Charisma and Experience

Missions 
The campaign consists of seven operations with a total of 35 missions of varying types in 22 locations with three different environments.

Battlefield 
The game pays great attention to the design of the maps and the missions to achieve a great ambiance replete with details and visual effects, and with a great playability and strategic depth.
Climate is another of the features in the game, including dense fog, rain and big snowfalls.
During the campaign the player will cover all scenarios of battle in the North of Europe, from the French countryside to the Ardennes, German towns and villages and finally the city of Berlin in ruins.

References

External links 
Reviews
vandal.net Review
otacongames.es Review
gamingxp.com Review

Turn-based strategy video games
PlayStation 3 games
PlayStation Network games
PlayStation Portable games
PlayStation Vita games
2010 video games
Video games developed in Spain
Embracer Group franchises
World War II video games
Xbox 360 Live Arcade games